Kyzyl-Bulak is a village in the Nookat District of Osh Region of Kyrgyzstan. Its population was 3,576 in 2021. Nearby villages include Besh-Burkan (1 mile) and Akchal (2 miles).

References

External links 
Satellite map at Maplandia.com

Populated places in Osh Region